The following is a chronicle of events during the year 2002 in ice hockey.

Olympics

National Hockey League
Art Ross Trophy as the NHL's leading scorer during the regular season: Jarome Iginla, Calgary Flames
Hart Memorial Trophy: for the NHL's Most Valuable Player: Jose Theodore, Montreal Canadiens
Stanley Cup - Detroit Red Wings defeat the Carolina Hurricanes in the 2002 Stanley Cup Finals
 The Columbus Blue Jackets selected Rick Nash with the first pick overall in the 2002 NHL Draft

Canadian Hockey League
Ontario Hockey League: The Erie Otters captured the J. Ross Robertson Cup.
Quebec Major Junior Hockey League: The Victoriaville Tigres won the President's Cup (QMJHL) for the first time in franchise history
Western Hockey League: The Kootenay Ice won the President's Cup (WHL)  
Memorial Cup: The Guelph Storm served as host team for the 2003 Memorial Cup, which was won by the Kootenay Ice.

International hockey

European hockey

Women's hockey
In 2002, at the age of 16, Shannon Szabados became the first female to play in the Western Hockey League. Szabados played in four exhibition games for the Tri-City Americans. On September 22, 2002 she played 20 seconds of a regular season game.

Minor League hockey

Junior A hockey

Season articles

Deaths

See also
1982 in sports

References